Võro Institute is an Estonian state research and development institution dedicated to the preservation and promotion of the Võro language and culture.

History

Võro is a language belonging to the Finnic branch of the Uralic languages. Traditionally, it has been considered a dialect of the South Estonian dialect group of the Estonian language, but nowadays it has its own literary language and is in search of official recognition as an autochthonous regional language of Estonia. Võro has roughly 75,000 speakers (Võros) mostly in southeastern Estonia, in the eight parishes of the historical Võru County: Karula, Harglõ, Urvastõ, Rõugõ, Kanepi, Põlva, Räpinä and Vahtsõliina. These parishes are currently centred (due to redistricting) in Võru and Põlva counties, with parts extending into Valga and Tartu counties. Speakers can also be found in the towns of Tallinn and Tartu and the rest of Estonia.

The institute was founded by the Estonian government in 1995 and is located in the Southern Estonian town of Võru. The directors of the institute have been Enn Kasak, Kaido Kama and Külli Eichenbaum. The present director of the institute is Rainer Kuuba. Researchers at the institute include the toponymist Evar Saar and the lexicographer Sulev Iva.

Activities
The institute is engaged in a wide range of activities to meet the challenges facing lesser-spoken languages, including establishing school programs, conducting linguistic and regional research, preserving place-names and their corresponding stories (mostly by Evar Saar), publishing Võro-language scholarship and school textbooks, and organizing annual language conferences. The aim of these activities is to encourage the Võro people to speak their own language and to preserve their characteristic life-style.

References

External links
 

Võro
South Estonian language
Research institutes in Estonia
Linguistic research institutes
Language advocacy organizations
1995 establishments in Estonia
Võru